George Quigley (born February 1, 1968) is an American sports shooter. He competed in the men's skeet event at the 1996 Summer Olympics.

References

External links
 

1968 births
Living people
American male sport shooters
Olympic shooters of the United States
Shooters at the 1996 Summer Olympics
Sportspeople from Cincinnati